Muircheartach Óg Ó Súilleabháin ( – 1754), was a soldier and smuggler.

Ó Súilleabháin was a native of the Beara Peninsula. He was serving as a soldier in Spain by 1739, and fought with the Clare's Dragoons at Fontenoy in 1745. He was a popular figure in local tradition down to recent times.

References
"Mort Oge O’Sullivan, Captain of the Wild Geese", John O’Mahony, Journal of the Cork Historical and Archaeological Society, 1892.
"Muircheartach Óg Ó Súilleabháin: Stair, Traidisiúin agus Marbhnaí", Pádraig A. Breatnach, Teamaí Taighde Nua-Ghaeilge, 1997
"An Plaintéir agus an Gael díshealbhaithe", Roibeárd Ó hÚrdail, Saoi na hÉigse..., 2000

External links
http://www.ainm.ie/Bio.aspx?ID=1466

Year of birth uncertain
1710 births
1754 deaths
18th-century Irish people
People from County Kerry
People from County Cork
Irish Jacobites
Irish soldiers in the French Army
Smugglers